Vipin Pubby (born 5 January 1956) is a former Resident Editor of The Indian Express, Chandigarh.

Pubby is an alumnus of Chail Military School. He did post graduation in English from Panjab University, Chandigarh. He has been a journalist since 1979 and has extensively covered the political and social developments in the Indian states of Jammu and Kashmir, Gujarat, North-Eastern states, Himachal Pradesh, Haryana and Punjab. 

He has been the Founder President of the Shimla Press Club.

He is also the author of the book Shimla Then and Now.

External links

References

1956 births
Living people
Indian male journalists
Indian newspaper editors
Indian columnists
Writers from Chandigarh